"Home" is the twenty-fifth single by B'z, released on July 8, 1998. This song is one of B'z many number-one singles in Oricon weekly chart. Japanese rock band L'Arc-en-Ciel released three singles in the same day. Although L'Arc-en-Ciel's three singles—"Honey", "Shinshoku (Lose Control)" and "Kasō"—passed the first week sales of 500,000 copies each and were ranked at number two, three and four respectively, the single "Home" managed to debut at the number-one position. The single sold over 961,000 copies according to Oricon. While they won "the artist of the year award", the song was elected as one of "songs of the year" at the 13th Japan Gold Disc Award.

Track listing 
Home
The Wild Wind

Certifications

References

External links
B'z official website

1998 singles
B'z songs
Oricon Weekly number-one singles
Songs written by Tak Matsumoto
Songs written by Koshi Inaba
1998 songs